Chkalovsky (masculine), Chkalovskaya (feminine), or Chkalovskoye (neuter) may refer to:
Chkalovsky District, name of several districts and city districts in Russia
Chkalovsky Airport, an airport near Moscow serving the Russian space program
Chkalovsky (rural locality) (Chkalovskaya, Chkalovskoye), name of several rural localities in Russia
Chkalovskaya metro station (disambiguation), name of several metro stations in Russia
Chkalovskoye Municipal Okrug, a municipal okrug of Petrogradsky District of St. Petersburg, Russia

See also
Chkalov (disambiguation)
Chkalovsk (disambiguation)
Valery Chkalov